Tactusa sumatrensis is a moth of the family Erebidae first described by Michael Fibiger in 2010. It is known from northern Sumatra in Indonesia.

The wingspan is 12–13 mm. The ground colour of the forewing is yellowish interrupted by brownish cross shades, especially by a medial shade. Only the terminal lines are visible, marked by dark-brown spots. The subterminal line is indicated by black patches outlined inwardly by yellow. The hindwing is dark grey, with an indistinct discal spot and the underside is unicolorous grey.

References

Micronoctuini
Taxa named by Michael Fibiger
Moths described in 2010